Gary Giles (12 January 1940 – 5 February 2014) was a New Zealand cricketer. He played 25 first-class matches for Northern Districts between 1961 and 1976. In the 1965/66 season, he earned a call-up to the New Zealand team and was 12th man for a Test match against the touring England side.

References

External links
 

1940 births
2014 deaths
New Zealand cricketers
Northern Districts cricketers
Cricketers from Hamilton, New Zealand